Hansel and Gretel  is a 1954 German film, directed by Walter Janssen, based on the story of Hansel and Gretel by the Brothers Grimm. It should not be confused with either Hansel and Gretel, another German film, or an American film Hansel and Gretel, both of which were released in the same year.

Cast 
 Jürgen Micksch – Hansel
 Maren-Inken Bielenberg – Gretel
 Jochen Diestelmann – The Father
 Ellen Frank – The Mother
 Barbara Gallauner – The Evil Witch

DVD release 
In 2007, Hänsel und Gretel was released on DVD in Germany.  The film was also part of a five DVD boxset, which contained other classic live-action German fairytale films made in the 1950s.

References

External links 
 
 Kinowelt Home Entertainment DVD 

1954 films
1950s fantasy films
Hansel und Gretel
Hansel und Gretel
Films based on Hansel and Gretel
German children's films
Films about witchcraft
1950s German films